Saint-Martin-sur-le-Pré is a commune in the Marne department in north-eastern France.

See also
Communes of the Marne department

References

Saintmartinsurlepre